The Dekum or the Dekum Building is a historic office building in downtown Portland, Oregon, United States.  It was listed on the National Register of Historic Places in 1980.

With its rusticated sandstone base, over-scaled arches at street level, and stone carvings, the eight-story building is a strong example of Romanesque Revival architecture. It was made completely from materials found in Oregon. Completed in 1892, it is named after Frank Dekum, a German immigrant who opened Portland's first candy shop. During construction, masons reportedly drank beer instead of the usual coffee.

Notable tenants
Former
 Wieden+Kennedy

See also
Architecture of Portland, Oregon
National Register of Historic Places listings in Southwest Portland, Oregon
Frederick Manson White of McCaw, Martin and White

References

External links

The Dekum Building and other Richardsonian stonework, Portland Oregon

Office buildings completed in 1892
Office buildings in Portland, Oregon
Commercial buildings on the National Register of Historic Places in Oregon
National Register of Historic Places in Portland, Oregon
Romanesque Revival architecture in Oregon
1892 establishments in Oregon
Frederick Manson White buildings
Southwest Portland, Oregon
Portland Historic Landmarks